Oscar Foxmay refer to:

 Oscar Fox Sr. (1892–1946), English footballer for Bradford City
 Oscar Fox Jr. (1921–1990), his son, English footballer for Sheffield Wednesday and Mansfield Town